Jack Skille (born May 19, 1987) is an American former professional ice hockey right winger. He played in the National Hockey League (NHL) for the Chicago Blackhawks, Florida Panthers, Columbus Blue Jackets, Colorado Avalanche, and the Vancouver Canucks. He has a podcast, the Jack Skille show.

Playing career

Amateur

As a highly regarded forward prospect, Skille was drafted by the Chicago Blackhawks with the seventh overall pick in the 2005 NHL Entry Draft out of USA Hockey's National Team Development Program. Skille was the third in the group of eight American-born players that were selected in the first round, surpassing the previous record of seven Americans selected in the first round in both 1986 and 2003.

In his freshman campaign at the University of Wisconsin–Madison for the Badgers men's ice hockey team, he made an immediate impact, leading all Badger freshmen in scoring with 12 goals and seven assists for 19 points. He also finished the season as the eighth-leading point-scorer for the team. Skille's goal 11:13 into the third overtime propelled the top-seeded Badgers past Cornell University 1–0 on March 26, 2006, in the NCAA Midwest Regional Final at the Resch Center, and into the team's first Frozen Four since 1992.

In his sophomore year, Skille suffered an injury that made him sit out a good portion of the season. After the Badgers failed to qualify for the 2007 NCAA tournament, Skille signed with the Norfolk Admirals, the Chicago Blackhawks' American Hockey League (AHL) affiliate.

Professional

After signing with the Blackhawks to a three-year, entry-level contract, Skille was assigned to the team's AHL affiliate, the Rockford IceHogs.

Skille made his NHL debut against the Los Angeles Kings on December 30, 2007. He was brought up from the IceHogs to cover for an injured player, and later scored his first career NHL goal and assist on January 8, 2008, against Cristobal Huet of the Montreal Canadiens. Skille was later selected to represent Rockford at the 2010 AHL All-Star Game.

Prior to signing with the Blackhawks for the 2010–11 season, Skille appeared in 30 games with the Blackhawks over three seasons (2007 to 2010), collecting eight points (five goals and three assists) and five penalty minutes, including two points (one goal and one assist ) in six regular season games with Chicago during the team's 2009–10 Stanley Cup-winning campaign.

During his first full season with the Blackhawks, on February 9, 2011, Skille was traded, along with Hugh Jessiman and David Pacan, to the Florida Panthers in exchange for Michael Frolík and Alexander Salák.

As a result of the 2012–13 NHL lockout, Skille signed with the GET-ligaen side Rosenborg of Norway to play until the end of the lockout. Skille did not receive any wages from Rosenborg, and was the first NHL player to play in the Norwegian league during the lockout.

On July 6, 2013, Skille was signed as a free agent by the Columbus Blue Jackets to a one-year, two-way contract. During a stretch with the Blue Jackets, he scored four goals in seven games played at the time.

On July 1, 2014, Skille was again on the move, signing as a free agent on a one-year, two-way contract with the New York Islanders. However, Skille returned to the Blue Jackets at the beginning of the 2014–15 season, on October 5, 2014, after being claimed off waivers. As a depth forward in his second season with the Blue Jackets, Skille appeared in 45 games scoring 6 goals.

As an unrestricted free agent, Skille left the Blue Jackets for a second successive season, however was unable to secure a contract in the off-season. On September 16, 2015, Skille signed a professional try-out contract to attend the 2015 training camp of the Colorado Avalanche. On October 6, 2015, after impressing in depth position in the pre-season the Avalanche announced they had signed Skille to a one-year, two-way contract. In a fourth line role, Skille remained with the Avalanche for the duration of the 2015–16 season, appearing in 74 games and registering 8 goals for 14 points.

Over the following off-season, Skille agreed to attend the Vancouver Canucks training camp, as a free agent, on a professional try-out basis on September 19, 2016. On October 11, 2016, the Vancouver Canucks announced that Skille had made it into the team's 23-man opening roster. On October 13, 2016, Skille was awarded a one-year, $700,000 contract with the Vancouver Canucks.

Following the 2017–18 season, having opted to play abroad in the Kontinental Hockey League with Belarusian club, HC Dinamo Minsk, Skille returned to North America as a free agent in the summer. Approaching the 2018–19 season, Skille accepted a professional try-out contract to attend the Ottawa Senators training camp on September 12, 2018. He was released from his professional try-out contract on September 23, 2018.

On October 1, 2018, Skille signed a one-year contract worth CHF 650,000 with Genève-Servette HC of the National League as a replacement for injured Lance Bouma. Skille played 23 regular season games (10 points) and only appeared in 2 of the team's 6 playoffs games, failing to score a single point. He was not offered a contract extension, becoming a free agent.

International play
Prior to joining the Badgers was a member of the USA Hockey-sponsored National Development Team. He won a gold medal at the 2005 IIHF World U18 Championships in the Czech Republic collecting a goals and three assists in six games at the championship. Skille collected 24 goals, 31 assists and 55 points in 54 games for the U.S. National Under-18 Team during 2004–05 and was whistled for 76 penalty minutes during the season. In international play as a NDTP player, Skille had tournament-best seven points to lead the Americans to first place at the Four Nations Cup in Ann Arbor, Michigan and led tournament with eight points as U.S. team placed first at Five Nations Tournament in Tjörn, Sweden.

He split the 2003–04 season with the U.S. Under-17 Team and U.S. Under-18 Team, playing in 61 games total, posted 25 goals, 19 assists and 44 points to go along with 61 penalty minutes. He also had a goal and an assist to help U.S. Under-18 Team to silver at 2004 IIHF World U18 Championships in Minsk, Belarus. Prior to him joining the US Development Team, Skille led the Verona Area Wildcats to two WIAA State Hockey Tournament appearances. He had a total of 99 points in the two years with Verona Area.

Personal life
Skille is the son of Lee and Carrie Skille. His father Lee skated at Wisconsin in the mid-1970s, served as the head hockey coach at Century High School in Bismarck, ND and head hockey coach and athletic director at Madison West High School. Skille has two sisters, Maggie and Claire. He attended Huron High School in Ann Arbor, Michigan, and Verona Area High School in Verona, Wisconsin.

Career statistics

Regular season and playoffs

International

References

Further reading

External links

1987 births
Living people
American men's ice hockey right wingers
American people of Norwegian descent
Chicago Blackhawks draft picks
Chicago Blackhawks players
Colorado Avalanche players
Columbus Blue Jackets players
HC Dinamo Minsk players
Florida Panthers players
Genève-Servette HC players
Sportspeople from Madison, Wisconsin
Ice hockey players from Wisconsin
National Hockey League first-round draft picks
Norfolk Admirals players
Rockford IceHogs (AHL) players
EC Red Bull Salzburg players
Springfield Falcons players
Thomas Sabo Ice Tigers players
Vancouver Canucks players
Wisconsin Badgers men's ice hockey players